Tien Chong (born 25 September 1994), is a Hong Kong singer-songwriter who made her debut in 2017. She was one of the seven first round competitors of Singer 2018, where she was eliminated on week five.

Early life 
On 25 September 1994, Chong was born in the United Kingdom. Chong's father is a Singaporean law student and her mother is a British nurse.

Career
Chong moved around often, staying in Singapore, United Kingdom, Thailand and Hong Kong. Recently, she settled down in Hong Kong to pursue her music career.
Tien is a contralto.

Career beginning: 2014–2017 

Chong was signed to MoFo Music in 2014 and has been developed and managed by Director/Producer Kelvin Avon.

Chong was the voice for the HTC One M9 international campaign. She had co-written with the UK-based producer/DJ SanXero, New York writer Curtis Richa, and has supported Hong Kong artist/producer Jun Kung for his 'Alive On Stage' performance at McPherson Stadium.

In July 2015, she was invited to a songwriting camp in London's iconic Abbey Road Studios where she wrote with different well-known songwriters.

On August 19–20 2016 she flew to Cuba to perform as the invited guest to Cuban Fusion Flamenco guitarist Reynier Marino at the National Theatre of Cuba for 2 nights as part of the 90th birthday celebrations of Fidel Castro.

Chong also starred in the DBS Bank-sponsored series Sparks which premiered mid-March 2017 and she sang the theme song for the online ad campaign. Since then, she has performed at Atlas Bar opening (Singapore), Daybreaker (Hong Kong) and many more.

Singer 2018 and TIEN: 2018–present 
Under Mofo Music Chong released her first single, "Breathless" , where the debut album was pending to be released.

Chong debuted as the first week contestant on Singer 2018. Following the premiere episode (where she placed 2nd), she was recognized as a "dark horse" by the Chinese media, and her participation led to a rise in numbers of followers on her Weibo account from around 100 fans to around 16,000 fans.

Chong remained in the competition for four more weeks until her elimination on week five. She later returned to the competition on the sixth week as a return performance, and another on the 12th week, the Breakouts, with the latter failing to qualify for the finale.

Details

Overall Ranking and Percentage of Votes 
Singer 2018 has four rounds of competition, and the overall ranking and percentage of votes was counted for every two shows, (the exception was on week three, due to the withdrawal of GAI.)

Discography

Studio Album

Singles

References

External links 

1994 births
Living people
Hong Kong contraltos
21st-century Hong Kong women singers